Aslauga marshalli, the dusky purple, is a butterfly in the family Lycaenidae. It is found in Cameroon, Angola, the Democratic Republic of the Congo, Burundi, Uganda, Kenya, Tanzania, Malawi, Zambia, Mozambique, Zimbabwe and possibly Nigeria. The habitat consists of savanna, Brachystegia-Julbernardia woodland, marshes and shallow lakes.

Adults have been recorded on wing year-round.

Subspecies
Aslauga marshalli marshalli (Angola, Democratic Republic of the Congo: Lualaba and Shaba, Burundi, Uganda, Kenya, Tanzania, Malawi, Zambia, Mozambique: Dondo Forest, Zimbabwe: Harare)
Aslauga marshalli adamaoua Libert, 1994 (Cameroon, possibly Nigeria)

References

Butterflies described in 1899
Aslauga
Butterflies of Africa
Taxa named by Arthur Gardiner Butler